When Animals Dream (originally titled as Når dyrene drømmer) is a 2014 Danish horror drama film, and the feature film directorial debut of Jonas Alexander Arnby. The film had its world premiere on 19 May 2014 at the Cannes Film Festival and stars Sonia Suhl as a teenager that discovers that she is transforming into a werewolf.

Plot 
Marie (Sonia Suhl) is a shy sixteen-year-old growing up in a remote fishing village in Denmark where she lives with her father Thor (Lars Mikkelsen) and mother (Sonja Richter), who is catatonic and confined to a wheelchair. She's bothered by a strange rash that develops on her chest, only to become more unnerved when she begins to sprout hair. During this time Marie begins working at a fish processing plant where her coworkers bully her under the false premise that it is hazing and not intended to be malicious. As Marie's body undergoes more changes, she begins to realize that her family has been hiding strange secrets and that her mother's current condition may relate to what Marie is currently going through.

Cast 
 Sonia Suhl as Marie
 Lars Mikkelsen as Thor
 Jakob Oftebro as Daniel
 Sonja Richter as Mother
 Mads Riisom as Felix
 Benjamin Boe Rasmussen as Ib
 Esben Dalgaard as Bjarne

Reception 
Critical reception for When Animals Dream has been generally positive. It has a score of 73% on Rotten Tomatoes and of 54% on Metacritic. Shock Till You Drop compared the film favorably with the similarly themed films Let the Right One In and Ginger Snaps and commented that it was "a movie that lurks quietly in the shadows, stalking you until its ready to pounce and show you what big, sharp teeth it has". The Hollywood Reporter and Twitch Film also praised the movie, and Twitch Film wrote that it was "a tremendous feature debut, haunting and elegiac, while not shying away from violence and sex. There is certainly no subtlety to the film; but then again, werewolves aren't meant to be subtle."

References

External links 
 

2014 films
2010s horror drama films
Danish horror drama films
2010s Danish-language films
2014 directorial debut films
2014 drama films